The Spyker C12 La Turbie is a sports car produced by Dutch automaker Spyker Cars in 2006. The LaTurbie was the first version of the C12 platform, being followed by the C12 Zagato one year later, which featured a unique Zagato designed body. Spyker originally planned to produce 25 LaTurbies, however, in October 2007 it was announced that Spyker had cancelled production of all C12 models, including the C12 LaTurbie and its sister model the C12 Zagato, before any cars were produced, in order to focus their resources on other models.

Overview
Top speed is 325 km/h (202 mph) with acceleration from 0–100 km/h (0-62 mph) in 3.9 seconds. A manual six-speed gearbox will be fitted with "an F1 style paddle shift under development". The car has two luggage compartments, with a leather Louis Vuitton luggage set available to order, specially designed to fit. Inside, gauges are designed by Swiss watchmaker Chronoswiss, which also produces limited-edition Spyker branded wristwatches. 

This is Spyker's third long wheelbase car, along with the C8 Double12 S and the C8 Double12 Spyder, which have V8 engines rather than W12s.

Specification
Price: $290,000 (£253,430)
Power: 372.9 kW / 500.1 bhp
Torque: 
0–60 mph (0–97 km/h): 3.9 seconds
Top Speed: 
Double twin exhausts
ABS
19" AerobladeT wheels (designed in-house by Spyker)
Rear wheel drive with Drexler limited slip differential
Lightweight aluminum space frame with integrated roll cage

References

C12 La Turbie
Sports cars
Convertibles
Rear mid-engine, rear-wheel-drive vehicles